Anatoma emilioi is a species of minute sea snail, a marine gastropod mollusk or micromollusk in the family Anatomidae.

Description
Shell of moderate size for the genus (1.75 mm) and trochiform turreted in shape. The protoconch has 0.75 whorls, has flocculent sculpture with fine spiral lines, the apertural varix is not connected to embryonic cap, apertural margin is sinusoid. The aperture is subquadratic, rood overhanging. Selenizone at periphery, keels strong, moderately strong elevated, distinctly inwardly curved; lunules distinct. Slit open.

Distribution
This species is only known from its type locality in the Hawaiian Islands, where it was found in depths between 37 and 183 m, in Mamala Bay, Oahu.

Etymology
This species was named in honor of Emilio Garcia of Lafayette, Louisiana, USA.

References

Anatomidae
Gastropods described in 2011